Watlington and Pyrton Hills is a  biological Site of Special Scientific Interest east of Watlington in Oxfordshire.

This site has floristically diverse chalk grassland, chalk scrub, broadleaved woodland and yew woodland. Watlington Hill has short turf which is grazed by rabbits, with flowering plants including yellow-wort, dropwort, horseshoe vetch, squinancywort and the nationally rare candytuft.

References

Sites of Special Scientific Interest in Oxfordshire
Hills of Oxfordshire
Chiltern Hills